The Gialias (also Yialias;) is the second longest river in Cyprus. In its course passes through the valley of Mesaoria and flows into Famagusta Bay. Its depth reaches up to 9 meters.

In 1952, the Pano Lythrodonta dam with a capacity of 32,000 m3 and a height of 10 meters was built in Gialias.

Folk tradition
There are many folk traditions associated with Gialias. In the village of Nisou in the Nicosia District, it is believed that it was once divided into two to be reunited at another point, where an island was created where the name of the village comes from. Another tradition says that in the area of the village of Assia, Pedieos and Gialias were united, the countess of the area decided to separate them and bring the riverbed next to the village, to its current riverbed.

See also
 List of rivers of Cyprus

References

Rivers of Cyprus
Bodies of water of Northern Cyprus